The Leopold Griffuel Prize (Prix Leopold Griffuel) for translational and clinical research is sponsored by the French ARC Foundation for Cancer Research.

The prize is designed to reward the accomplishments of and encourage further research among the world's leading cancer researchers. Past American recipients of the Griffuel Prize include Samuel Broder, former director of the National Cancer Institute; C. Everett Koop, former U.S. Surgeon General, and Anita Roberts, pioneer in research on TGF-beta.

Recipients receive a cash award of €15,000 (valued at approximately US$20,000 as of 2014).

Recipients
Source (to 2005) : ARC
 49th=(2021) - Divyansh Palia - Healthcare and Biological Research Association at Strasbourg University
 48th=(2019) - Steve Jackson -  Wellcome Trust/ Cancer Research UK Gurdon Institute at the University of Cambridge 
 47th=(2018) - Martine Piccart - Jules Bordet Institute
 46th=(2017) - Riccardo Dalla-Favera - Institute for Cancer Genetics at Columbia University 
 45th=(2016) - Richard Marais - Manchester Institute, UK 
 44th=(2015) - Olivier Delattre - Institute Curie, France
 44th=(2015) - Michel Attal - University Institute of Cancer, France
 43rd=(2014) - Brunangelo Falini - University of Perugia, Italy
 43rd=(2014) - Yosef Yarden - Weizmann Institute, Israel
 42nd (2013) - Jiri Lukas -  Novo Nordisk Foundation Center for Protein Research, Denmark
 41st (2012) - Guido Kroemer - Gustave Roussy, France
 40th (2009) - Hans Clevers - Hubrecht Institute, Netherlands
 39th (2008) - Hugues de Thé - Saint-Louis Hospital, France
 38th (2007) - Anne Dejean-Assémat - Pasteur Institute, France
 37th (2006) - Sebastian Amigorena - Institute Curie, France
 36th (2005) - Carlo Croce - The Ohio State University
 35th (2004) - Alexander Varshavsky- California Institute of Technology of Pasadena, USA
 34th (2003) - Anita Roberts - National Cancer Institute, USA
 33rd (2002) - Kari Alitalo - Council for Health, Finland
 32nd (2001) - Jacques Pouysségur - CNRS, France
 31st (2000) - Leland Hartwell - Fred Hutchinson Cancer Research Center, USA
 30th (1999) - Thierry Boon-Falleur - Ludwig Institute, Belgium
 29th (1998) - Miroslav Radman
 28th (1997) - Gérard Orth - CNRS, France
 27th (1996) - Pierre May - CNRS, France
 26th (1995) - Pierre Potier - Institut de Chimie des Substances Naturelles du CNRS, France
 25th (1994) - Georges Mathé - University of Paris-Sud, France
 24th (1993) - Samuel Broder
 23rd (1992) - Jérôme Lejeune
 22nd (1991) - Umberto Veronesi
 21st (1990) - François Cuzin - University of Nice, France
 20th (1989) - C. Everett Koop
 19th (1988) - Steven A. Rosenberg
 18th (1987) - Pierre Chambon
 17th (1986) - M. Anthony Epstein
 16th (1985) - Jean-Bernard Le Pecq - Institut Gustave Roussy, Villejuif, France
 15th (1984) - Michael Feldman - Weizman Institute, Israel
 14th (1983) - Robert Gallo
 13th (1982) - Dominique Stehelin - Institut Pasteur de Lille, France
 12th (1981) - Hamao Umezawa
 11th (1980) - Vincent DeVita
 10th (1979) - Charlotte Friend
 9th (1978) - Elisabeth Miller - McArdle Laboratory for Cancer Research, University of Wisconsin
 8th (1977) - Raymond Latarjet - Institut du Radium, Paris
 7th (1976) - Ludwig Gross
 6th (1975) - Henry S. Kaplan
 5th (1974) - Richard Doll
 4th (1973) - George Klein
 3rd (1972) - Howard M. Temin
 2nd (1971) - Georges Barski - Institut Gustave Roussy, Villejuif, France
 1st (1970) - Joseph Burchenal - Memorial Sloan Kettering Cancer Center, New York

See also

 List of biomedical science awards
 List of prizes named after people

References

External links
 Complete list of laureates, 1970 - 2005

Awards established in 1970
Cancer research awards
French science and technology awards